Midleton was a constituency represented in the Irish House of Commons until 1800. Incorporated by Charter, 1671 whereby it was granted to  Sir John Brodrick with a Corporation sovereign, two bailiffs and 12 burgesses. It was disenfranchised at the Act of Union and compensation of £15,000 paid to Viscount Midleton.

Borough
This constituency was based in the town of Midleton in County Cork.

Members of Parliament

Notes

Elections
 1692
 1695
 1703
 1707
 1713
 1715
 1716
 1727
 1741 (by-election)
 1775 (by-election)
 1758
 1759
 1761
 1768
 1776
 1781
 1783
 1790
 1793
 1797
 1799
 1800

See also
Midleton, a town in County Cork
Irish House of Commons
List of Irish constituencies

References

Constituencies of the Parliament of Ireland (pre-1801)
Historic constituencies in County Cork
Midleton
1671 establishments in Ireland
1800 disestablishments in Ireland
Constituencies established in 1671
Constituencies disestablished in 1800